"Freestyler" is a song by Finnish hip hop group Bomfunk MC's. It was released in Finland on 30 October 1999 as the third single from their debut studio album, In Stereo (1999), and was released internationally in February 2000. "Freestyler" peaked at number four on the Finnish Singles Chart and topped the charts in more than 10 countries, including Australia, Germany, Italy, and New Zealand. The song also peaked within the top 10 of the charts in Denmark, Iceland, Ireland, and the United Kingdom.

Composition
"Freestyler" is primarily a breakbeat song, with strong influences of UK dance culture and electronic dance music, as well as some influences from drum and bass and hip hop. It is written in the key of E minor and composed in a tempo of 164 beats per minute.

Critical reception
Daily Record described "Freestyler" as a "cracking old-skool track". CMJ New Music Monthly described the track as "a housed-up hip-hoppity mélange of sampled slide-guitar, rubbery synth bass and Caribbean-inflected dance instructions; a dancefloor natural."

Music video
The music video for the song was mainly filmed at the Hakaniemi metro station, an underground station on the Helsinki Metro line in Finland and with platforms 21 metres below sea level. The principal "home boy" featured in the video is Marlo Snellman, a Finnish model and musician, who later released his own single entitled "Dust" and went on to work as producer for his own projects such as "Hipsters" and "Okta". The actor was 15 years old at the time of shooting and got the part through his mother, Finnish modelling magnate Laila Snellman. 

The video begins with a man dancing extravagantly during the instrumental intro of the song as Marlo is catching a train while listening to "Freestyler" on his MiniDisc (Sony Walkman MZ-R55) player. A character sits across him in the train, who is played by Raymond Ebanks (B.O. Dubb), the lead singer of the Bomfunk MC's, and who imbues Marlo's Sony MiniDisc remote controller with the ability to pause, rewind or fast-forward individuals. Realising this ability, Marlo spends the duration of the video manipulating passersby, dancers and even the train, with Raymond appearing in the background wherever he goes, watching Marlo. As Marlo comes across the Bomfunk MC's, he tries to manipulate them to no effect. As Raymond approaches Marlo, he accidentally rewinds himself, and the whole video is then sent into backward rewind. The music video is a play on themes of empowerment, with the power of the music being transferred to and in the end taken from Marlo by Ebanks. There is a continuity error in the video with the number on the train carriage changing throughout the sequence.

During the video, Marlo comes across the main character from the music video of "Uprocking Beats", another song from In Stereo, and freezes him. Marlo also appears briefly in the music video of "B-Boys & Flygirls", reversing and forwarding the car the main characters are driving.

The music video was parodied by Funky Bong in Assembler (k)—an entry for the Assembly 2000 wild demo competition; it placed fifth in the contest. The music video was later parodied by the hip hop group Raptori for their song "Hiphopmusiikkia". In 2011, the beginning scene was remade in the music video of DJ RZY's "Tervetuloo Helsinkiin". In 2019, the beginning scene was also tributed in a hardcore techno fashion in the music video "Luonnon Nostatus" by Teknoaidi & Iconobreaker featuring Samu Kuusisto.

2019 music video

For the twentieth anniversary in 2019, a new music video was produced featuring the original band members, with updates to reflect developments in technology and culture. The central figure is now a girl with a mobile phone, with various Belgian YouTuber cameo appearances.

The 2019 music video was filmed at Vukov Spomenik railway station, an underground station on the BG Voz commuter railway network serving Belgrade, Serbia. The new video had been sponsored by communications provider Telenet (Belgium) to promote a new mobile phone service.

Track listings

Finnish 12-inch single and Australian maxi-CD single
 "Freestyler" (radio edit) – 2:52
 "Freestyler" (alternative radio edit) – 4:07
 "Freestyler" (Happy Mickey Mouse mix)	– 4:47
 "Freestyler" (Missing Link remix) – 5:40

European CD single
 "Freestyler" (radio edit) – 2:52
 "Freestyler" (album version) – 5:06

European maxi-CD single
 "Freestyler" (radio edit) – 4:07
 "Freestyler" (Skillsters remix) – 3:03
 "Freestyler" (Happy Mickey Mouse mix) – 4:48
 "Freestyler" (Missing Link remix) – 5:40
 "Freestyler" (album version) – 5:06

UK CD1
 "Freestyler" (radio edit) – 2:52
 "Freestyler" (alternative radio edit) – 4:07
 "Freestyler" (Dirty Rotten Scoundrels Surgical Spirit dub) – 7:59

UK CD2
 "Freestyler" (radio edit) – 2:52
 "Freestyler" (Dirty Rotten Scoundrels Surgical Spirit mix) – 8:04
 "Freestyler" (Tuff Twins mix) – 7:13

UK cassette single
 "Freestyler" (radio edit) – 2:52
 "Freestyler" (alternative radio edit) – 4:07

Australian CD single
 "Freestyler" (radio edit) – 2:52
 "Freestyler" (Tuff Twins mix) – 7:13
 "Freestyler" (Dirty Rotten Scoundrels Surgical Spirit mix) – 8:04
 "Freestyler" (Skillsters remix) – 3:03
 "Freestyler" (alternative radio edit) – 4:07

US maxi-CD single
 "Freestyler" (radio edit) – 2:52
 "Freestyler" (Missing Link mix) – 5:39
 "Freestyler" (Happy Mickey Acid Break mix) – 4:47
 "Freestyler" (Skillsters mix) – 3:03
 "Sky's the Limit" (radio edit) – 3:58
 "Freestyler" (album version) – 5:06

US 12-inch single
A1. "Freestyler" (Missing Link remix) – 5:40
A2. "Freestyler" (radio edit) – 4:07
B1. "Freestyler" (Happy Mickey Acid Break mix) – 4:48
B2. "Freestyler" (Skillsters remix) – 3:03

Charts

Weekly charts

Year-end charts

Decade-end charts

Certifications and sales

Release history

See also
 List of Romanian Top 100 number ones of the 2000s

References

External links
 Official Freestyler video on YouTube

1999 songs
1999 singles
2000 singles
Bomfunk MC's songs
Dutch Top 40 number-one singles
European Hot 100 Singles number-one singles
Number-one singles in Australia
Number-one singles in Austria
Number-one singles in Germany
Number-one singles in Greece
Number-one singles in Italy
Number-one singles in the Netherlands
Number-one singles in New Zealand
Number-one singles in Norway
Number-one singles in Romania
Number-one singles in Sweden
Number-one singles in Switzerland
Ultratop 50 Singles (Flanders) number-one singles
Ultratop 50 Singles (Wallonia) number-one singles